TV 2 Sonen 24/7 was a Norwegian interactive television channel based on a show on TV 2 and TV 2 Zebra where viewers could communicate with the host via SMS. play games and request songs.

External links
Sonen blir egen TV-kanal

Defunct television channels in Norway
Television channels and stations established in 2007
Television channels and stations disestablished in 2007